Wheeler Hutchison Bristol  (January 16, 1818 Canaan, Columbia County, New York – November 21, 1904 DeLand, Volusia County, Florida) was an American engineer, railroad executive and politician. He was New York State Treasurer from 1868 to 1871.

Life
He was born on January 16, 1818, in Canaan, Columbia County, New York, to George Bristol and Sally (Hutchinson) Bristol.

He married Mary Ann Worthington on October 5, 1848.

In 1886, his residence on the "Glenmary" estate, which he had bought from Nathaniel Parker Willis who had lived from 1837 to 1842 in another house nearby, at Owego was burgled after he had moved to Florida.

He died on November 21, 1904, in DeLand, Volusia County, Florida.

References

Sources

 Dem. State Convention, in NYT on September 2, 1852
 His nomination, in NYT on September 19, 1853

1818 births
1904 deaths
New York State Engineers and Surveyors
New York State Treasurers
Florida state senators
People from Canaan, New York
People from Owego, New York
19th-century American railroad executives
19th-century American politicians